Dolni Rakovets is a village in western Bulgaria. It is located in Radomir Municipality, Pernik Province. The village is known for its long traditions in garlic production.

Geography
Dolni Rakovets is located 8 km southeast of Radomir, and about 25 km south of Pernik. It is situated in the middle of the Radomir plain with an average altitude of 640 m.

Infrastructure
The transport is well developed and integrated with the national transport system. Dolni Rakovets is located 13 km from the Struma motorway, which connects Sofia with Greece. The train station is part of railway line 5 from Sofia to Kulata, with more than 10 trains passing through the village every day. The village is accessible by bus line 2 Radomir - Dolni Rakovets - Chukovets.

Dolni Rakovets airfield is located 5 km south of the village. It was built for military purposes between 1962 - 1966. The runway is 2450 m long and 50 m wide. In 2011 the airport was renamed to Sofia West Airport.

References

Villages in Pernik Province